Intrepido was the name of at least four ships of the Italian Navy and may refer to:

 , an  launched in 1912 and sunk in 1915.
 , an  ordered by Japan from a British builder as Kawakaze she was sold to Italy in 1917 before launching and renamed Intrepido. Two days later she was further renamed Audace. Launched in 1917, seized by Germany in 1943 and renamed TA20. Sunk in 1944.
 , a  launched in 1943. Seized by Germany and renamed TA25 in September 1943. She was sunk in 1944.
 , an  launched in 1962 and decommissioned in 1991.

Italian Navy ship names